Priscilla Garita (born March 14, 1968) is an American actress, best known for her role as Gabi Martinez in NBC soap opera Sunset Beach.

Life and career
Garita was born in New York City. She is of Costa Rican descent. In 1993 she made her soap debut on Another World, and later had recurring roles in All My Children and As the World Turns.

Garita is best for playing the role of Gabi Martinez on the now-defunct NBC soap Sunset Beach for the show's entire run from January 1997 to December 1999. Garita was credited during January 1997, but her first appearance on the soap was in February 1997. In 2000 she was cast in the NBC pilot of the short-lived TV series Titans, but later was replaced to Lourdes Benedicto. Garita has also portrayed the role of Theresa Lopez-Fitzgerald on another NBC soap, Passions on a temporary basis from August to September 2004. During this time, Lindsay Hartley (the original Theresa) was on maternity leave with husband Justin Hartley.

Garita appeared on number of primetime dramas include Diagnosis Murder, Charmed, Ghost Whisperer, Law & Order: LA, Off the Map, CSI: Miami, Castle, and Rizzoli & Isles. In 2011, she appeared on General Hospital as Lupe. In March 2022, she replaced Inga Cadranel as Harmony Miller for the multiple episodes of General Hospital when Cadranel had COVID during filming.

Filmography

References

External links

1968 births
American soap opera actresses
Living people
American television actresses
Actresses from New York City
University of Connecticut alumni
20th-century American actresses
21st-century American actresses